Pleasant Corners can refer to the following unincorporated communities in Pennsylvania:
Pleasant Corners, Carbon County, Pennsylvania
Pleasant Corners, Lehigh County, Pennsylvania